Wolfgang Dietrich may refer to:

 Wolfgang Dietrich (businessman) (born 1948), German businessman
 Wolfgang Dietrich (footballer) (born 1949), Australian rules footballer
 Wolfgang Dietrich (political scientist) (born 1956), Austrian peace researcher and political scientist